Luke Rollason is a British actor and physical comedian. He plays a lead role in the Disney+ series Extraordinary, as Jizzlord.

Early life
Rollason studied English at the University of Oxford where he was awarded the Mansfield Scholarship.

Career  
Rollason attended clown school in France at the L'Ecole Philippe Gaulier. However, Rollason told the British Comedy Guide he favours the use of the term “physical comedian” for himself. After university Rollason moved to London and where he would perform his comedy with homemade props. He has said that when he was a student seeing the physical comedian Trygve Wakenshaw was “a revelation” as to what it was possible to try and do on stage. He has said the best advice Gaulier gave him was "We are always searching. When you find your style, that is a good day to die".

At the 2022 Brighton Festival Rollason set up The Luke Rollason Memorial Bursary aiming to encourage performers from alternative backgrounds to bring unusual approaches to comedy. The bursary offers the cost of their registration fee, contributions to marketing costs and free rehearsal space. His 2022 show at the Edinburgh Fringe Festival was called Bowerbird. He had previously performed it at the 2021 fringe as a work-in-progress. It was described as a “madcap potpourri of mime and existential angst”.

In 2023 Rollason appeared as the lead role in Jack, a film about a university student, told from the point of view of his penis. Other small telelvision roles for Rollason have included Becoming Elizabeth and Industry.

In December 2021 Rollason was cast in the Disney+ series Extraordinary as Jizzlord, a shapeshifting cat/human. The show was broadcast in January 2023 and was well received enough to be renewed for a second season by Disney+ that same month. He described Extraordinary as "probably the first thing that I auditioned for where the script made me laugh out loud". He said his background in physical comedy helped him with his role of Jizzlord and that where he always had "quite an unusual body…very slender and quite boney looking" being a physical stage performer "helped me feel a lot more confident about my body, in ways that now feel like very second nature to me". Although Extraordinary is nominally a super-hero series Rollason spoke about how "those powers often end up being a reflection of that character's own insecurities about themselves". He plays the role with "great charm" according to Mike Hale in The New York Times.

Selected filmography

References

External links

Alumni of Mansfield College, Oxford
Living people
Date of birth unknown
English television actors
British comedians
English clowns